{{Infobox military unit
|unit_name= 15th Infantry Division (Ready Reserve)
| image= 15th Infantry Division (Ready Reserve) Unit Seal.jpg
| image_size = 100
|caption= Unit Seal of the 15th Infantry Division (Ready Reserve)
|dates= 10 July 2006 – Present
|country=  Philippines
|allegiance=  Republic of the Philippines
|branch=  Philippine Army
|type=   Army Reserve  Light Infantry Division
|role= performs multiple military roles in Conventional and Unconventional Warfare, Humanitarian Assistance and Disaster Response (HA/DR), and Civil-Military Operations (CMO)
|size= 5 Brigades, 15 Battalions. Total is 6,320 trained and operational citizen-soldiers
|command_structure= Philippine Army Reserve Command (Since 2006)
|current_commander=  BGen Marcelo B Javier Jr (RES) AFP
|garrison= NCRRCDG Cpd, Fort Andres Bonifacio, Metro Manila
|ceremonial_chief=
|colonel_of_the_regiment=
|nickname= "Defender & Builder Division" "Division Defensor y Constuctor"
|patron=
|motto= "Defender & Builder""Defensor y Constuctor"|colors=
|march=
|mascot= Crossed Rifle & Shovel
|battles=
|notable_commanders= BGen Marcelo B Javier Jr (RES) AFP
|anniversaries=10 July 2006
|decorations=  Philippine Republic Presidential Unit Citation Badge
|battle_honours= None
|identification_symbol_label= Search and Rescue Tab
|identification_symbol= 
|identification_symbol_2_label= Laang Kawal Seal
|identification_symbol_2= 
|identification_symbol_3_label= Philippine Army Infantry Branch Insignia
|identification_symbol_3= 
|identification_symbol_4_label=
|identification_symbol_4=
}}
The 15th Infantry Division (Ready Reserve), Philippine Army, known as the Defender & Builder Division, is one of the Army Reserve Command's ready reserve infantry divisions.

The unit specializes in Urban Warfare, Urban Search and Rescue, Humanitarian Assistance and Disaster Relief, and Civil-Military Operations. It operates in the National Capital Region.

History

The Philippine Army felt the need to re-organize its reserve units in the National Capital Region (NCR) when the 9th Infantry Division (Ready Reserve) was deactivated and the newly created regular infantry division (9ID) took its numerical designation.

The Commission on Appointments, confirmed the promotion of Colonel Javier Jr to brigadier general on 21 September 2012.

On 3 December 2012, Colonel Javier Jr was sworn in as a brigadier general by President Benigno S. Aquino III, together with other newly promoted generals of the AFP at the Rizal Hall of the Malacañan Palace.

The division, since its activation, has performed countless Civil-Military Operations, Search and Rescue Operations and directly assist then AFP National Capital Regional Command and now the AFP Joint Task Force-National Capital Region in fulfilling its mandate of ensuring peace and order within the National Capital Region.AFP Joint Task Force-National Capital Region#Line Units

Mission
 Base for expansion of the Regular Force in the event of war, invasion or rebellion within its AOP.
 Assist the Government in Relief and Rescue Operations in the event of Calamities or Disasters.
 Assist the Government in Socio-economic development and environmental concerns.
 Assist in the operation and maintenance of essential government and private utilities (e.g. power, telecommunications, water).

Vision
A well disciplined, organized, trained and non-partisan citizen army, able to augment the regular force and respond to national disasters and threats to national security, during peacetime, war or rebellion mandated to perform tasks of Military Operations Other Than War (MOOTW).

Lineage of Commanding Officers
  COL RAFAEL M ALUNAN III (RES) PA (during operational term as 9th Infantry Division) (2002 – 10 Jul 06)
  BGEN MARCELO B JAVIER JR (RES) AFP – (10 Jul 06 – PRESENT)

Organization
The following are the Base/Brigade units that are under the 15th Infantry Division (RR).

Base Units
  Headquarters & Headquarters Service Battalion (HHSBn)
  Service Support Battalion (SSBn)
  Military Police Company (MP Coy)
 Engineering Combat Battalion (ECBn)
  Reconnaissance Battalion (Recon Bn)
  Military Intelligence Battalion (MIBn)
  Search and Rescue Unit (SARU)
  Mechanized Infantry Battalion (MBn) (Proposed)

Line Units
  1501st Infantry Brigade (Ready Reserve)
  1502nd Infantry Brigade (Ready Reserve)
  1503rd Infantry Brigade (Ready Reserve)
  1504th Infantry Brigade (Ready Reserve)
  1505th Infantry Brigade (Ready Reserve)

Trainings
The following are division-level special trainings undertaken by the unit soldiers:
 Basic Citizen Military Training
 Military Orientation Training
 Pre-Deployment Training
 Disaster Emergency Assistance and Rescue Training
 High Angle Rescue Training
 Mountain Search and Rescue Training
 Water Search and Rescue Training
 Urban Search and Rescue Training
 Civil Military Operations Orientation Training
 Special Forces Operations Orientation Training
 Field Artillery Orientation Training
 Combat Engineering Orientation Training
 Small Unit Tactics Training
 VIP Security Training
 Motorcycle Unit Training
 Combat Lifesaver Training
 Reservist Intelligence Collection Training
 Military Intelligence and Security Training
 Counterintelligence Refresher Course
 Military Intelligence Agent Training
 Explosive Ordnance Reconnaissance Agent cross-trained with Counter Improvised Explosive Device

Training is supervised and course-directed by reserve officers who are occupational specialty qualified, former active duty members, and already incorporated in the ready reserve force.

Unit soldiers also undertake regular courses from the AFP and regular Army TRADOC and special schools. There are reservists who are already authorized to don infantry, ordnance, civil military operations, psychological operations and airborne badges. The unit reservists also undertake specialized trainings from other government agencies.

Many unit officers and personnel have already served the fixed two-year called-to-active-duty tour in the regular force. As a modern reserve force, many possess advanced degrees, technical and professional certifications that fill skill gaps in the regular force. Most of the officers and personnel are also employed in local government administration and private and government security services. Reservists of the unit are considered excellent force multipliers in internal security and external defense operations.

Operations
 Various Civil-Military Operations
 Various Internal Security Intelligence and Counterintelligence Operations
 Various National-level Disaster Field Demonstrations and Exercises
 Various Disaster Relief and Rehabilitation Operations
 Rescue and Relief Operations TS Ondoy & Pepeng (September – October 2010)
 Rescue and Relief Operations TS Sendong (October 2011)
 Rescue and Relief Operations West Monsoon HABAGAT (August 2012)
 Intelligence Support for Counter Narcotics Operations in various cities of Metro Manila
 Rescue and Relief Operations Super Typhoon Yolanda (November 2013)
 Rescue and Relief Operations (TF Glenda) (16 Jul 14 – 17 Jul 14)
 Rescue and Relief Operations (TF Mario) (19 Sep 14 – 21 Sep 14)

Awards and decorations
Campaign streamers

Badges

Gallery

References
Citations

Bibliography
 The Public Affairs Office, Philippine Army: The first 100 years, 1998, Philippine Army.
 HPA GO Nr 290 dtd 16 June 2006.
 HARESCOM GO Nr 233 dtd 20 July 2006.
 The Training Committee, Basic Citizens Military Training Manual'', 2009, HARESCOM.

Infantry divisions of the Philippines
Military units and formations established in 2006
Reserve and Auxiliary Units of the Philippine Military